The Lars Peter Larson House is a historic house in Cleveland, Utah. It was built in 1908 for Lars Peter Larson, the son of Danish immigrants who converted to the Church of Jesus Christ of Latter-day Saints. Larson, who worked as farmer, shepherder, and a salesman for the LDS-run Cleveland Cooperative Mercantile Association, lived here with his wife, née Nora Oveson. The house was designed in the Shingle style, and it was meant to resemble a castle. The Larsons moved to Salt Lake City in 1915, and the house was acquired by Joseph Locke, followed by Harry C. Allred, and Ronald Norris. Larson died in Los Angeles in 1962. The house has been listed on the National Register of Historic Places since February 13, 1980.

References

		
National Register of Historic Places in Emery County, Utah
Shingle Style architecture in Utah
Houses completed in 1908
1908 establishments in Utah